Daniel Immerwahr is an American historian, professor, and associate department chair of History at Northwestern University. His book, Thinking Small, won the Merle Curti Award. His book, How to Hide an Empire, was a national bestseller, one of the New York Times critic's top books of the year, and winner of the Robert H. Ferrell Prize.

Early life and education
Immerwahr originates from a Jewish family and is the great-grandson of a cousin of Clara Immerwahr, pioneering chemist and first wife of Fritz Haber. He completed an undergraduate degree at Columbia University, and a second undergraduate degree at King's College, Cambridge, where he was a Marshall Scholar, and a doctorate at the University of California, Berkeley.

Career 
He is a professor of history at Northwestern University. His work has appeared in n+1, Slate, Jacobin, and Dissent.

Works 
 Thinking Small: The United States and the Lure of Community Development Cambridge, Mass. Harvard University Press 2015. , 
 How to Hide an Empire: A History of the Greater United States, New York: Farrar, Straus and Giroux, 2019. ,

References

External links 
 

Living people
Year of birth missing (living people)
20th-century American historians
20th-century American male writers
21st-century American historians
21st-century American male writers
Columbia College (New York) alumni
Friends' Central School alumni
University of California, Berkeley alumni
20th-century American writers
Northwestern University faculty
American male non-fiction writers